Cyborg 2087 is a 1966 science fiction film directed by Franklin Adreon and written by Arthur C. Pierce. The film stars Michael Rennie, Karen Steele, Wendell Corey, and Warren Stevens.

Plot

In 2087, free thought is illegal and the population is controlled by governments. A small band of free thinkers sends Garth A7, a cyborg, back in time to 1966 to prevent Professor Sigmund Marx from revealing his new discovery. The discovery will eventually make mind control possible and create a tyranny in Garth's time. He is pursued by two "Tracers" (also cyborgs) sent by the government to stop him.

Garth enlists the help of Dr. Sharon Mason, Marx's assistant. He gets her to summon her friend, medical doctor Zeller to operate on him to remove a homing device used by the Tracers to track him. The local sheriff also becomes involved.

Garth defeats the Tracers and convinces Professor Marx to keep his discovery secret. Then, with his future wiped out as a result, Garth ceases to exist; the people who helped him do not even remember him.

Cast
 Michael Rennie as Garth
 Karen Steele as Dr. Sharon Mason
 Wendell Corey as the sheriff
 Warren Stevens as Dr. Zeller
 Eduard Franz as Professor Sigmund Marx
 Harry Carey, Jr. as Jay C
 Dale Van Sickel as Tracer #1
 Troy Melton as Tracer #2
 John Beck as Skinny

Reception

TV Guide rated it 1/5 stars and wrote that it is "an honest attempt make a statement, but it is poorly executed". The Encyclopedia of Science Fiction noted the similarities between this film and Terminator 2: Judgment Day. It said that while the movie had a better grasp of time travel paradoxes than other movies of the era, that the performances were weak. DVD talk found that while the movie was cheap, it was better than its reputation.

Production

It was part of a series of nine low-budget films produced by United Pictures Corporation. The films were intended for TV distribution, but they had theatrical releases. The writer and director's next film, Dimension 5, also featured time travel. The budget was $100,000 in 1966.

Home media

It was remastered and released on Blu-Ray in 2017.  It was released in the United Kingdom with minor cuts, reducing the run time by two minutes.

See also
Demon with a Glass Hand
List of American films of 1966

References

Sources

External links
 
 

1966 films
1960s science fiction films
American science fiction films
1960s English-language films
Cyborg films
Films set in 1966
Films set in 2087
Films about telepathy
Films about time travel
United Pictures Corporation
Films scored by Paul Dunlap
Films directed by Franklin Adreon
1960s American films